Tivadar Soros (born Theodor Schwartz; 7 April 1893 – 22 February 1968) was a Hungarian lawyer, author and editor. He is best known for being the father of billionaire George Soros, and engineer Paul Soros.

He was born into an Orthodox Jewish family in Nyírbakta, Hungary, near the border with Ukraine. His father had a general store and sold farm equipment. When Tivadar was eight, his father moved the family to Nyiregyhaza, the regional center in north-eastern Hungary, providing a somewhat less isolated life experience.

He first met his wife Erzebet when she was eleven years old during a visit to the home of her father Mor Szücs, a cousin of his own father.

He studied law at the University at Cluj, in what was then Hungarian Transylvania. 

Soros fought in World War I and spent years in a prison camp in Siberia before escaping. He founded the Esperanto literary magazine Literatura Mondo (Literary World) in 1922, having learned the language from a fellow soldier during the war and edited it until 1924. He wrote the short novel Modernaj Robinzonoj (Modern Robinsons) (1923), republished in 1999 by Bero (an Esperanto publisher) afterwards translated into several languages and Maskerado ĉirkaŭ la morto (Masquerade (dance) around death), published 1965, an autobiographical novel about his experience during the Nazi occupation of Budapest, Hungary. Maskerado has been translated into English, French, Hungarian, Italian, Polish, Czech, Russian, German and Turkish.

He died in New York in 1968.

References

External links

Review of Modern Robinsons
Description of Maskerado book (broken link)
Soros: The Life and Times of a Messianic Billionaire

1893 births
1968 deaths
20th-century American lawyers
20th-century Hungarian lawyers
Austro-Hungarian military personnel of World War I
Austro-Hungarian prisoners of war in World War I
Esperanto speaking Jews
Hungarian editors
Hungarian Esperantists
Hungarian Jews
Hungarian writers
Lawyers from New York City
American magazine founders
Tivadar
Writers of Esperanto literature